Chestnut Hill is a historic home located at Windsor Township, York County, Pennsylvania. It was built in 1940–1941, and is a 2-story, plus basement, Colonial Revival-style dwelling.  It measures 94 feet wide and has a cross gable of 40 feet deep.  The first story is sandstone and the second is sheathed in redwood clapboard. It features direct outdoor access from all rooms on the main floor and an elliptical, two-story front hall with a spiral staircase. Also on the property are a contributing picnic pavilion (c. 1936) and playhouse /toolshed (1941).

It was added to the National Register of Historic Places in 2001.

References

Houses on the National Register of Historic Places in Pennsylvania
Colonial Revival architecture in Pennsylvania
Houses completed in 1941
Houses in York County, Pennsylvania
National Register of Historic Places in York County, Pennsylvania